Bandar is an upazila (sub-district) of the Narayanganj District in central Bangladesh, part of the Dhaka Division. Bandar is a part of Greater Dhaka; the conurbation surrounding the Bangladeshi capital city of Dhaka.

Geography
It has a total area of 55.84 km2. It is separated from Narayanganj Sadar Upazila and Munshiganj Sadar Upazila by the Shitalakshya River to its west and south. Bandar is bounded by Sonargaon Upazila to its north and east.

History

The history of Bandar spans several centuries, and it became a principal port (bandar) not far from the medieval capitals of Sonargaon and Jahangirnagar. In 1481 AD, the Bandar Shahi Mosque was constructed which became a focal point for Islam in Bandar. A Muslim preacher and Bengal Sultanate officer by the name of Haji Baba Saleh migrated to a village in Bandar where he invited the locals to Islam. The village then came to be known as Salehnagar, or the city of Saleh. A mosque and mazar (mausoleum) was later built and named after him in 1504 AD.

After the fall of the Bengal Sultanate in the late sixteenth century, independent chieftains formed a confederacy known as the Baro-Bhuiyans to defend Bengal from Mughal integration. Numerous battles were fought in Bandar between the Mughal forces and Baro-Bhuiyans such as Musa Khan, Dawud Khan, Abdullah Khan and others. Musa's grandson, Dewan Munawwar Khan, later moved his residence to what came to be known as Dewanbagh (or Munawwar Khan Bagh) in Bandar, where he also built the Qadam Rasul monument and was buried east of the historic Dewanbagh Mosque. Historians suggest that the Sonakanda Fort in Bandar was built by Mughal governor Mir Jumla II to protect against pirates.

Bandar was established as a thana in 1964. During the Bangladesh Liberation War of 1971, a mass killing was conducted in Sirajdoullah Club playground leading to the death of 54  people on 3 April. On 22 November, a brawl took place between the Pakistan Army and the Bengali freedom fighters at the banks of the Shitalakshya in Dhamgar. Another battle took place 5 days later in which a Pakistan Army gunboat was destroyed and numerous Pakistan Army soldiers killed. Defeated again on 12 December, the Pakistan Army fled to the western side of the Shitalakshya. A direct encounter took place in Bandar Railway Station where many soldiers were killed or wounded and were forced to surrender. Bandar Thana became liberated on 15 December. In 1993, Bandar Thana's status was upgraded to upazila.

Demographics

According to the 2011 Bangladesh census, Bandar Upazila had 73,171 households and a population of 312,841, 53.2% of whom lived in urban areas. 9.8% of the population was under the age of 5. The literacy rate (age 7 and over) was 58.9%, compared to the national average of 51.8%.

Administration
Bandar Upazila is divided into five union parishads: Bandar, Dhamgar, Kalagachhia, Madanpur, and Musapur. The union parishads are subdivided into 89 mauzas and 158 villages.

Economy and tourism
Bandar's ancient history has made it a popular place of tourism. Home to 252 mosques, noted ones include the Bandar Shahi Mosque, the mosque and mausoleum of Haji Baba Saleh and the Farazikanda Mosque. Other notable sites include the Qadam Rasul in Nabiganj and the Sonakanda Fort, both dating back several hundred years.

See also
 Upazilas of Bangladesh
 Districts of Bangladesh
 Divisions of Bangladesh

References

 
Upazilas of Narayanganj District